Association Sportive des Forces Armées (Dakar) is a Senegalese football club based in Dakar. They play in the second division in Senegalese football.

In 1971 the team has won the Senegal Premier League.

Performance in CAF competitions
CAF Confederation Cup:
1972 African Cup of Champions Clubs 
1973 African Cup of Champions Clubs
1975 African Cup of Champions Clubs

Honours
Senegal Premier League:1971, 1972, 1974

References

External links

Sports clubs in Dakar
Football clubs in Senegal